The Boulevard Barbès is a boulevard in the 18th arrondissement of Paris. It is named after French politician Armand Barbès. It was built in 1867 during Haussmann's renovation of Paris. It is 835 metres long and 35 metres wide.

Notable buildings 

Nos. 11, 13 & 15: the buildings of the former Grands Magasins Dufayel. In 1856, Jacques François Crespin opened the « Palais de la Nouveauté » on a section of the old rue des Poissonniers. Commerce extended on the boulevard and became in 1888 the Grands Magasins Dufayel. After a series of extensions they occupied the whole rectangle between the boulevard and the rue Christiani, the rue de Sofia and the rue de Clignancourt. The two domes at the corner of the rue Christiani and the rue de Sofia were constructed in 1910. The Grands Magasins closed in 1930.
No. 90: the church of Saint-Paul de Montmartre is a Lutheran church, opened in 1897. It was the work of Adolphe Augustin Rey.

In popular culture
L'automne à Barbès Rochechouart, a song by Jean-Claude Vannier
Get Low, a song by Dillon Francis and DJ Snake 
La Zoubida, a song by Lagaf'
Barbès, an album by Rachid Taha
B.E.Z.B.A.R., a song by Scred Connexion
Viens faire un tour à Barbès, a song by Scred Connexion's Ahmed Koma with DJ Maze and Cheb Tarik
Thé à la menthe, a song by La Caution
Historias de un arrabal parisino, a semi-autobiographical novel by Vicente Ulive-Schnell
Barbès, a song by Fédération Française de Fonck (FFF)
, a Parisan-based band influenced by Gnawa and other popular music of the North Africans who immigrated settled in the Barbès neighborhood in the second half of the 20th century.

See also
Barbès – Rochechouart (Paris Métro) station, and neighborhood

References

Jacques Hillairet, Dictionnaire historique des rues de Paris, Minuit, Paris, 1963

18th arrondissement of Paris
Boulevards in Paris